The African Cup of Champions Clubs 1988 was the 24th edition of the annual international club football competition held in the CAF region (Africa), the African Cup of Champions Clubs. It determined that year's club champion of association football in Africa. The tournament was played by 37 teams and was used a playoff scheme with home and away matches.

Entente de Sétif from Algeria won that final, and became for the first time CAF club champion.

Preliminary round

|}

First round

|}
1

Second round

|}

Quarter-finals

|}

Semi-finals

|}

Final

Champion

Top scorers

The top scorers from the 1988 African Cup of Champions Clubs are as follows:

Notes

External links
Champions' Cup 1988 - rsssf.com

1
African Cup of Champions Clubs